Dimitar Emilov Pirgov (born 26 October 1989) is a Bulgarian professional footballer who plays as a defender. He is the younger brother of Lokomotiv Plovdiv's goalkeeper Ilko Pirgov.

Career
Pirgov began his football career with Chavdar Etropole. On 12 February 2012, he signed for Pirin Gotse Delchev. He made his league debut against Slivnishki geroi on 14 March, playing the full 90 minutes. Pirgov finished the season with 10 appearances, as Pirin clinched promotion to the A PFG. He was acquired by Slavia Sofia in late January 2014. After playing for Levski Sofia for two years, Pirgov signed a contract with Botev Plovdiv on 23 January 2018. Pirgov joined  CSKA 1948 in May 2020.

International
He was called up to the senior Bulgaria squad by Ivaylo Petev for a 2018 FIFA World Cup qualifier against Luxembourg in September 2016. Pirgov earned his first cap on 7 October under Petev's successor Petar Houbchev, playing the full 90 minutes in the 1:4 away loss against France in another qualification match for the 2018 World Cup.

Career statistics

Club

References

External links
 
 Profile at LevskiSofia.info

1989 births
Living people
Bulgarian footballers
Bulgaria international footballers
Association football defenders
FC Chavdar Etropole players
PFC Pirin Gotse Delchev players
PFC Slavia Sofia players
PFC Levski Sofia players
Botev Plovdiv players
FC CSKA 1948 Sofia players
PFC Beroe Stara Zagora players
First Professional Football League (Bulgaria) players